The 2015–16 FC Ufa season was the club's 2nd season in the Russian Premier League, the highest tier of association football in Russia, and 5th in total. Ufa will also be taking part in the Russian Cup.

Squad

Youth team

Out on Loan

Transfers

Summer

In:

Out:

Winter

In:

Out:

Competitions

Russian Premier League

Matches

League table

Russian Cup

Squad statistics

Appearances and goals

|-
|colspan="14"|Players away from the club on loan:

|-
|colspan="14"|Players who left Ufa during the season:

|}

Goal Scorers

Disciplinary record

References

FC Ufa seasons
Ufa